Gregg Sutton is an American musician, songwriter, guitarist, singer and bassist, who lives in Los Angeles.

Career
Gregg has written hits for Sam Brown ("Stop!"), Joe Cocker ("Tonight" and seven others) and contributed songs to Maria McKee, Lone Justice, Carla Olson, Papa John Creach, Jeff Healey, Nelson, Curtis Stigers (together with Shelly Peiken), John McVie, Percy Sledge, Andrew Strong, Matraca Berg, Billy Ray Cyrus, Charles & Eddie, Tal Bachman, O-Town, Thick Pigeon, Ane Brun, Joe Bonamassa, Heather Small, John Farnham, Swirl 360, Chris Thompson, Aurical, The Human League, Tom Jones, Beth Hart, Teresa James, The Nighthawks, Andy Griffith, Edgar Winter, Bloodline, Del McCoury, Ray Stevens, Jason Ringenberg, Timothy B. Schmit, Chris LeDoux, Shannon Curfman, and Eric Burdon.

During the 1980s, he played bass for Bob Dylan on Real Live (1984). He also played bass for Barry Goldberg, Sass Jordan, Carla Olson, Mick Taylor, Dave Alvin, Coup de Grace, The Pets, KGB (along with Carmine Appice), Tony Gilkyson, Avery Sharpe and Katy Moffatt.

He is also featured on The Rolling Stones' Lost & Found Vol. 2 on the track "Tombstone Blues" along with Carlos Santana, Bob Dylan, Mick Taylor, Colin Allen and Ian McLagan.

He was the musical director for Andy Kaufman's show at Carnegie Hall in 1979. He is also featured in the 1980 movie Andy Kaufman Plays Carnegie Hall and as an actor in the motion picture Man on the Moon, starring Jim Carrey. He has appeared in the 2015 documentary Kaufman Lives.

Sutton has a current sub publishing deal with Supreme Songs Ltd, and several of his songs have been used in a number of TV series the past few years. He embarked on a UK and European tour in November 2019.

References

External links
 

Year of birth missing (living people)
Living people
American male composers
21st-century American composers
American bass guitarists
American male bass guitarists
21st-century American male musicians